Driving Park usually refers to places that currently are or formerly were site of harness or auto racing tracks.

Places named Driving Park:
 Worcester Driving Park, Worcester Agricultural Fairgrounds, Worcester Massachusetts
 Maple Avenue Driving Park, Dunn Field (Elmira), Elmira, New York
 Driving Park (Rochester, New York), Rochester, New York
 Omaha Driving Park, North Omaha, Nebraska
 Driving Park, Columbus, Ohio
 Houston Driving Park (1902), Houston, Texas

 Charlottetown Driving Park, Charlottetown, Prince Edward Island, Canada